Per Anders Håkansson (born April 27, 1956) is a retired professional ice hockey player who played 330 games in the National Hockey League (NHL) for the Minnesota North Stars, Pittsburgh Penguins, and Los Angeles Kings. Internationally, he played for the Swedish juniors at the 1976 World Junior Ice Hockey Championships, and for Sweden men's national ice hockey team at the 1981 World Ice Hockey Championships and at the Canada Cup in 1981 and 1984.

Career statistics

Regular season and playoffs

International

External links

1956 births
AIK IF players
Living people
Los Angeles Kings players
Minnesota North Stars players
People from Munkfors Municipality
Pittsburgh Penguins players
St. Louis Blues draft picks
Swedish expatriate ice hockey players in the United States
Swedish ice hockey left wingers
Winnipeg Jets (WHA) draft picks
Sportspeople from Värmland County